Paweł Kamil Jaroszyński (born 2 October 1994) is a Polish professional footballer who plays as a left back for Ekstraklasa club Cracovia, on loan from Salernitana.

Club career
Jaroszyński started his career with Cracovia.

On 18 July 2017, he signed a four-year deal with Chievo Verona.

On 22 June 2019, Genoa announced the signing of Jaroszyński. Shortly after, on 7 August 2019, he moved to Serie B club Salernitana on loan until 30 June 2020. On 21 September 2020, he returned to Serie B, joining Pescara on another season-long loan. On 1 February 2021, he returned to Salernitana on another loan spell. On 17 July 2021, the loan was renewed with a conditional obligation to buy.

On 31 August 2022, after joining Salernitana on a permanent basis, he returned to Cracovia on loan until the end of the season.

Career statistics

References

1994 births
Living people
Sportspeople from Lublin
Association football defenders
Polish footballers
Poland youth international footballers
Poland under-21 international footballers
Serie A players
Serie B players
Górnik Łęczna players
MKS Cracovia (football) players
Ekstraklasa players
A.C. ChievoVerona players
Genoa C.F.C. players
U.S. Salernitana 1919 players
Delfino Pescara 1936 players
Polish expatriate footballers
Expatriate footballers in Italy
Polish expatriate sportspeople in Italy